João Carlos Santos do Amaral (born 25 August 1967), known as Cacaio, is a Brazilian football manager and former forward. He is one of the best known former players and current head-coaches/managers in Brazil. having as footballer, acted clubs in Flamengo, Itaperuna, Bangu and Santa Cruz. But it was by Paysandu in that if more stressed the lead-lot for the first time in Campeonato Brasileiro Série A, with the conquest of the Série B and being gunner this edition. then migrated to the arquirrival Rowing and also served by Guarani, Remo, Criciúma, Sion and even by Ponte Preta, Vila Nova and acting by Brasil de Pelotas and Pelotas.

After finishing his career as a player, he returned to Itaperuna from 2007 to 2008. and after working various clubs of Para: Cametá and Paragominas, of the 2012. in 2013, he commanded Tuna Luso and returned to Paragominas the following year. At beginning of 2015 he returned to command the Cametá and also this year controls Remo.

Club career statistics

Honours

Player
Paysandu
 Campeonato Brasileiro Série B: 1991

Remo
 Campeonato Paraense: 1994

Vila Nova
 Campeonato Brasileiro Série C: 1996

Manager
Cametá
 Campeonato Paraense: 2012

Remo
Campeonato Paraense: 2015

References

1967 births
Living people
Sportspeople from Florianópolis
Brazilian footballers
Brazilian football managers
Campeonato Brasileiro Série A players
Campeonato Brasileiro Série B players
Campeonato Brasileiro Série D managers
Brazilian expatriate footballers
Expatriate footballers in Switzerland
CR Flamengo footballers
Itaperuna Esporte Clube players
Bangu Atlético Clube players
Santa Cruz Futebol Clube players
Paysandu Sport Club players
Guarani FC players
Clube do Remo players
FC Sion players
Criciúma Esporte Clube players
Associação Atlética Ponte Preta players
Vila Nova Futebol Clube players
Grêmio Esportivo Brasil players
Esporte Clube Pelotas players
Itaperuna Esporte Clube managers
Tuna Luso Brasileira managers
Clube do Remo managers
Villa Nova Atlético Clube managers
Association football forwards